Panoraama is a  tall gyro tower at the Linnanmäki amusement park in Helsinki, Finland. Panoraama was built in 1987 by the Swiss Intamin and offers capacity for 400 visitors per hour. It was originally known as Panorama, but the name was changed to Panoraama (with an additional letter "a") when Linnanmäki changed the naming policy for its rides and started to use only words that are correct in the Finnish language.

Originally, Linnanmäki was planning a real observation tower, like the considerably taller Näsinneula at the Särkänniemi park in Tampere, but first there were legal issues and later problems with funding. Eventually, Linnanmäki chose to build a tower in the form of a gyro tower ride.

See also
 List of towers

References

External links
 

Amusement rides introduced in 1987
Observation towers in Finland
Buildings and structures in Helsinki
Linnanmäki
1987 establishments in Finland